Mike Rodríguez may refer to:

Mike Rodríguez (footballer) (born 1989), Ecuadorian footballer
Mike Rodríguez (fighter) (born 1988), American mixed martial arts fighter